Sherif El Bendary (born 29 September 1978) is an Egyptian film director, writer and producer. His debut feature film was Ali, the Goat and Ibrahim.

Life and career
Sherif graduated from the Faculty of Applied Arts in 2001 then worked in textile factories. Later, he joined the Egyptian Film Institute in 2002 and graduated in 2007, where he currently teaches film directing. 
His directorial debut was the 2006 short film Rise and Shine starring Hend Sabry and produced by the National Film Center, the film won numerous awards locally and internationally including Tribeca Film Festival. In 2008, El Bendary wrote and directed At Day's End based on a short story by the acclaimed Egyptian novelist Ibrahim Aslan. In 2011, he directed the feature-length documentary On the Road to Downtown and the short film Curfew which is a part of the anthology film 18 Days – official selection Cannes Film Festival. 
In 2014, his short film Dry Hot Summers won the Robert Bosch Stiftung film prize from the Berlinale Talents campus, it premiered at Clermont-Ferrand International Short Film Festival and Dubai International Film Festival. In 2017, He released his first feature-length narrative film Ali, the Goat and Ibrahim an Egyptian/Emirati/French co-production, which won the Best Actor prize at Dubai International Film Festival and was released in Egypt and France and many other countries. He also directed the TV series Al Gamaa Part 2, written by veteran screenwriter Wahid Hamed and was broadcast in 2017.

He served as a jury member in several festivals including Cairo International Film Festival, El Gouna Film Festival and the Egyptian National Film Festival.

In 2019, El Bendary founded Africa Films, a production company which mainly focuses on short and feature films by promising upcoming first- and second-time directors, and which will also produce Spray, his second feature film.

Filmography

Feature-length films
 On the Road to Downtown (2011) (Documentary)
 Ali, the Goat and Ibrahim (2016)

Short films

Television
 Al-Gamaah 2 (2016) (TV Series)

Festivals and awards

References

External links
 
 Sherif El Bendary on elcinema.com

Egyptian film directors
1978 births
Living people
Cairo Higher Institute of Cinema alumni